The 2013 TAC Cup season was the 22nd season of the TAC Cup competition. Eastern Ranges have won there 2nd premiership title after defeating the Dandenong Stingrays in the grand final by 112 points (This is the biggest margin win in a NAB grand final).

Ladder

Grand Final

References

NAB League
Nab League